Okay Arpa (born July 15, 1977 in Kayseri, Turkey) is a Turkish karateka competing in the kumite +84 kg division.

He is a teacher of physical education serving at a primary school in Üsküdar, Istanbul.

Achievements
2011
  9th European Karate Regions Championships - June 4, Ankara TUR - kumite team

2010
  8th European Karate Regions Championships - May 29, Warsaw POL - kumite team
  45th European Championships - May 7, Athens GRE - kumite team

2009
  7th European Karate Regions Championships - May 30, Madrid ESP - kumite team
  44th European Championships - May 8, Zagreb CRO - kumite +84 kg

2008
  19th World Championships - November 13, Tokyo JAP - kumite team
  44th European Championships - May 2, Tallinn EST - kumite +80 kg

2006
  41st European Championships - May 5, Zagreb CRO - kumite team

2004
  39th European Championships - May 7, Moscow RUS - kumite open
  39th European Championships - May 7, Moscow RUS - kumite team

2001
  14th Mediterranean Games - September 9, Tunis TUN - kumite open

2000
  35th European Championships - May 5, Istanbul TUR - kumite +80 kg

1998
  33rd European Championships - May 5, Belgrade SRB - kumite +80 kg

References

1977 births
People from Kayseri
Living people
Turkish male karateka
Sportspeople from Istanbul
Turkish schoolteachers
Mediterranean Games bronze medalists for Turkey
Competitors at the 2001 Mediterranean Games
Mediterranean Games medalists in karate
21st-century Turkish people